Sertich is a surname. Notable people with the surname include:

Andy Sertich (born 1983), American-Croatian ice hockey player
Marty Sertich (born 1982), American ice hockey player
Mike Sertich (1921-2020), American ice hockey coach
Steve Sertich (born 1952), American ice hockey player
Tony Sertich (born 1976), American politician